Bala Jaddeh (also Romanized as Bālā Jāddeh) is a village in Sadan Rostaq-e Gharbi Rural District, in the Central District of Kordkuy County, Golestan Province, Iran. At the 2006 census, its population was 3,140, in 887 families.

References 

Populated places in Kordkuy County